RFA Echodale (A170) was a Dale-class fleet tanker of the Royal Fleet Auxiliary.

She was decommissioned on 12 April 1959 and was laid up at Devonport Dockyard.

References

Dale-class oilers
Tankers of the Royal Fleet Auxiliary
1940 ships